Our Lady of Lourdes Hospital may refer to:

 Our Lady of Lourdes Hospital (Daet), in Daet, Camarines Norte, Philippines
 Our Lady of Lourdes Hospital, Drogheda, in Drogheda, County Louth, Ireland
 Our Lady of Lourdes Hospital (Manila), in Manila, Philippines
 Our Lady of Lourdes Regional Medical Center, a hospital in Lafayette, Louisiana, United States
 Virtua Our Lady of Lourdes Hospital, a hospital in Camden, New Jersey, United States

See also 
 Lourdes Hospital (disambiguation)
 Our Lady of Lourdes